Republika Srpska earlier Serb Republic of Bosnia and Herzegovina had own vehicle registration plates.

The standard license plates in the Republic of Srpska consisted of a two-letter city code which was separated by Serbian cross from four numbers to six numbers. There was 14 different city codes in Republic of Srpska.

City codes 

СС - Istočno Sarajevo (Српско Сарајево)
ПД - Prijedor (Приједор)
БЛ - Banja Luka (Бања Лука)
БЧ - Brčko (Брчко)
ТБ - Trebinje (Требиње)
МГ - Mrkonjić Grad (Мркоњић Град)
СЊ - Srbinje (Србиње)
ДО - Doboj (Добој)
ЗВ - Zvornik (Зворник)
МД - Modriča (Модрича)
БН - Bijeljina (Бијељина)
ВГ - Višegrad (Вишеград)
ДВ - Drvar (Дрвар)
НЊ - Nevesinje (Невесиње)

Related articles 

 Vehicle registration plates of Bosnia and Herzegovina

Transport in Republika Srpska
Srpska